Anders Wirenius  (29 April 1850, Saint Petersburg - 29 August 1919) was a Finnish politician. He was twice Vice-chairman of the Home Office of the Senate of Finland in 1909 and in 1917. He was acting Chairiman of the Senate from 15 to 26 March 1917, at which point Finland declared its independence.

1850 births
1919 deaths
Politicians from Saint Petersburg
Finnish politicians
Finnish senators